Parhelophilus rex  (Curran and Fluke, 1922), the  Dusky Bog Fly , is a fairly common species of syrphid fly observed in northern North America.  Hoverflies can remain nearly motionless in flight. The adults are also known as flower flies for they are commonly found on flowers, from which they get both energy-giving nectar and protein-rich pollen. The larvae are unknown.

References

Eristalinae
Articles created by Qbugbot
Insects described in 1922
Hoverflies of North America